Old Essex House is a Grade II listed house at Station Road, Barnes, London SW13 0LW.

It has its origins in the late 16th/early 17th centuries. It is now a doctors' surgery

References

Buildings and structures in the London Borough of Wandsworth
Grade II listed houses
Houses in the London Borough of Wandsworth